Zahringer is a surname. Notable people with the surname include:

George Zahringer (born 1953), American golfer and stockbroker
Joseph Zähringer (1929–1970), German physicist
Klaus Zähringer (born 1939), German sport shooter